Joseph Bertrand (born 1879, date of death unknown) was a French swimmer and water polo player who won a silver medal in the Men's 200 metre team swimming event at the 1900 Summer Olympics. He also participated in water polo at the 1900 Summer Olympics.

References

External links
 

1879 births
Year of death missing
French male freestyle swimmers
Olympic swimmers of France
Swimmers at the 1900 Summer Olympics
Olympic silver medalists for France
French male water polo players
Water polo players at the 1900 Summer Olympics
Olympic water polo players of France
Olympic silver medalists in swimming
Medalists at the 1900 Summer Olympics
Date of birth missing
Place of birth missing
Place of death missing